is an interchange passenger railway station in located in the city of  Yokkaichi, Mie Prefecture, Japan, operated by Central Japan Railway Company (JR Tōkai) and the third sector railway company, Ise Railway.

Lines
Kawarada Station is served by the JR  Kansai Main Line, and is 44.1 rail kilometers from the terminus of the line at Nagoya Station. It is also officially the terminus of the 22.3 kilometer Ise Railway, although most trains continue through to Yokkaichi Station.

Station layout
The station consists of two opposed side platforms, serving four tracks for use by the Kansai Main Line, and a single island platform for use by the Ise Railway.

Platforms

Adjacent stations 

|-
!colspan=5|Central Japan Railway Company (JR Central)

|-
!colspan=5|Ise Railway

History
Kawarada Station opened on December 20, 1895 as a station on the Kansai Railway. The line was nationalized on October 1, 1907, becoming part of the Japanese Government Railways (JGR) system. The station building was rebuilt in December 1915. The JGR became the Japan National Railways (JNR) after World War II. The JNR Ise Line began operations on September 1, 1973. The Ise Line was privatized on March 27, 1987, four days before the dissolution of the JNR on April 1, 1987. The present station building was completed in March 2003.

Station numbering was introduced to the section of the Kansai Main Line operated JR Central in March 2018; Kawarada Station was assigned station number CI13.

Passenger statistics
In fiscal 2019, the JR station was used by an average of 2,127 passengers daily (boarding passengers only) and the Ise Railway portion of the station by 1779 passengers daily during the same period.

Surrounding area
Mie Prefectural Yokkaichi Agricultural High School
Yokkaichi City Kawarada Elementary School
Yokkaichi Kawarada Post Office

See also
 List of railway stations in Japan

References

External links

 Ise Railway Official home page 

Railway stations in Japan opened in 1890
Railway stations in Mie Prefecture
Stations of Central Japan Railway Company
Stations of Ise Railway
Yokkaichi